P. A. Mohammed Riyas is an Indian politician currently serving as the Minister for Public Works Department and Tourism, Government of Kerala. He is the Kerala state committee member of the Communist Party of India (Marxist), and the former All India President of the Democratic Youth Federation of India (DYFI).

Early life, family and education 
Riyas was born in Calicut. His father P. M. Abdul Khader, was an Indian Police Service officer.
His relative P.K Moidheenkutty Sahib was former president KPCC Kerala Pradesh Congress Committee, AICC member, freedom fighter and member of Madras assembly in 1937.

Riyas did his schooling at St. Joseph's Boys' Higher Secondary School, Kozhikode and joined Farook College, Kozhikode for his pre-degree education. He continued in the same college for his under-graduate degree in Bachelor of Commerce. Later he secured a law degree from Government Law College, Kozhikode.

Personal life 

He married Dr. Sameeha Saithalavi in 2002 and later divorced her in 2015 and they have two sons. On 15 June 2020, he married T. Veena, the daughter of Kerala Chief Minister Pinarayi Vijayan.

Political career 
During his school days in St Joseph Boys High School, Kozhikode Mohammed Riyas was active with Students' Federation of India (SFI). In his 8th standard, he became the President of the SFI unit committee, and in the next year, he became the unit secretary of the school committee. In his pre-degree days in Farook College, Calicut he was elected as the first-year pre-degree representative of the college. In 1994 Riyas became the unit president of SFI committee in Farook College, and in the next conference he became the secretary of the unit. From Farook college, he won the post for university union councillor of Calicut University in 1996–97. Later he became a university union office-bearer in 1998. Riyas gradually became a prominent leader of SFI.

Riyas was a member of the Democratic Youth Federation of India, where he rose to become the president and finally the secretary of DYFI Kozhikode District Committee. From 2010 to 2016 he worked in the state centre of DYFI Kerala committee. During this period, he held the office of State Vice President and later Joint Secretary of DYFI Kerala state committee. In 2016, he was elected as the All-India Joint Secretary of DYFI. In 2017, he became the All India President of DYFI.

Riyas also joined the Communist Party of India (Marxist) in 1993, where he was a district committee member for Kozhikode, as well as a state committee member.

Electoral politics 
During the 2009 Indian general election, Riyas was the Communist Party of India (Marxist) candidate for Kozhikode. M. K. Raghavan won the constituency with a margin of 838 votes over Riyas. Riyas contested the election result with a petition to the Kerala High Court alleging that Raghavan had published propaganda against him in print media. The petition was dismissed on 17 May 2010.

P A Muhammed Riyas won from the constituency Beypore on margin of 28,747 Votes in 2021 Kerala Assembly Elections.

Political views 
Riyas has criticised and opposed the Citizenship (Amendment) Act 2019 (CAA). He views the opposition against the CAA as a struggle for defending the Constitution of India. On 6 January 2020, he led a rally against the CAA with 100,000 people at Calicut Beach.

References

Kerala politicians
Living people
Kerala MLAs 2021–2026
DYFI All India Presidents
1975 births